Spark the Electric Jester is a 2017 platform game created by Brazilian developer Felipe Daneluz. The story follows the titular Spark on his journey to stop a mobilizing army of robots from taking over the world. Gameplay involves a mix of fast-paced platforming and melee combat over a series of differently themed levels. An array of power-ups are distributed throughout, each characterized by a unique set of abilities for use in battle and traversal.

Daneluz previously created a variety of fangames based on the Sonic the Hedgehog series and drew inspiration from his work in the creation of Spark the Electric Jester. He was primarily influenced by 16-bit-era platform game series, including Sonic, Kirby, and Mega Man X. Aside from its sound and programming, development was handled primarily by Daneluz while in college. After a successful Kickstarter campaign, Spark the Electric Jester was eventually released for Windows as his first commercial title. Critics appreciated its iteration of 16-bit-era gameplay and directed praise towards its mechanics, unlockable content, and soundtrack. A sequel, Spark the Electric Jester 2, was released in May 2019, followed by Spark the Electric Jester 3 in August 2022.

Gameplay

Spark the Electric Jester is a 2D side-scrolling platformer inspired by 16-bit-era console games. The player must guide the titular Spark through a series of differently themed levels containing an assortment of obstacles, robotic enemies, and boss fights. Spark's momentum is reactive to level terrain, gaining and losing speed accordingly from inclines and vertical loops. The player's base traversal abilities consist of a jump, wall jump, and a dash to both accelerate forward and parry enemies. They are fought with melee attacks, of which three can be chained together into a combo. Additionally, the player is capable of releasing charged shots horizontally and vertically. Dealing attacks will prompt a blue meter, referred to as the "Static Bar", to rise. Once full, it can be expended by releasing a charged shot, enhanced with power. A variety of power-ups are distributed across the levels, each characterized by a unique move set and cosmetic change to Spark. They endow the player with different attacks, traversal abilities, or both. Some powers give the player a different special attack when the Static Bar is full.

Completing the game will unlock Fark, Spark's doppelgänger, as a playable character. Differences in his campaign include less health, altered level design, new boss fights, and a unique move set. As Fark, the player is able to double jump and walk on walls and ceilings. Chaining together at least three regular attacks beforehand will strengthen his next upward or lower attack. The Static Bar is built up through a similar method by attacking enemies as well as through successfully executing parries. Depending on the timing, a parry may either increase or decrease the Static Bar. Perfectly timed parries will net additional increment. If the bar reaches a certain threshold, it can be expended for invincibility and a power boost, alongside full health replenishment. Once the bar is full, Fark will enter a powerful state.

Hard modes are available for both characters and introduce modifications to enemy placement, boss fights, and the player's amount of hit points. A time attack mode is also playable.

Plot
The story begins with Spark, an anthropomorphic character of the Formie species, explaining his origins to the player. After obtaining a job as a circus performer, Spark was replaced with a robot bearing a close resemblance to himself. In the present day, Spark overlooks his city in discontent, lamenting the increasing presence of robots in his society. As the robots abruptly begin to attack the people of the city, Spark intervenes to stop them. After Spark defeats the robots throughout the city, he encounters his look-alike from the circus. The look-alike taunts him before running off, igniting a rivalry between the two. Spark subsequently travels across the planet to fight the mobilizing robotic army, learning of their plans for world domination. He dubs his look-alike "Fark", a portmanteau of "Spark" and "fake".

Spark is eventually introduced to a small group of friendly robots and an engineer named Doctor Armstrong. Armstrong explains that he created an autonomous robot to guard Megaraph, a towering robot production facility. The robot, dubbing himself Freom, developed a dogmatic personality and amassed an army through the dissemination of a computer virus. Armstrong also discovered that Fark's intended purpose was to masquerade as an ally of Freom and eventually betray him, but had been unsuccessful in doing so. Armstrong enlists Spark to infiltrate Freom's battle airships as well as Megaraph, where Spark can confront him.

After defeating Fark in a final duel, Spark ascends up Megaraph and encounters Freom sitting atop a throne of machinery. Freom reveals his plan to launch the facility into the planet's orbital ring, bringing about a mass extinction. As Megaraph lifts off into space, Fark thrusts his staff into the sky to aid Spark from the surface. Brandishing the staff, Spark transforms into a more powerful form and pursues Freom up to Megaraph's peak. With his newfound strength, he is able to defeat Freom and thwart his plans.

Development and release

Spark the Electric Jester was created by Felipe Daneluz, a developer from São Paulo, Brazil. He had previously immersed himself in Sonic the Hedgehog fangame development after having discovered the open-source game engine Sonic Worlds. The engine was developed by collaborators from the Sonic Fan Games HQ website for designing Sonic-style levels with the Multimedia Fusion 2 program. Daneluz had desired to create a Sonic game since he was a child, and was able to familiarize himself with the engine due to its accessibility to those lacking programming experience. He went on to develop three 2D Sonic fangames during his time as a game design student: Sonic Before the Sequel, Sonic After the Sequel, and Sonic Chrono Adventure. The games were released between 2011 and 2013 and were downloaded over 120,000 times.

The idea for Spark the Electric Jester originated from a concept in After the Sequel dubbed "Beam Sonic", a mixture of Sonic the Hedgehog and the Beam power-up from the Kirby series. Daneluz was curious as to what the concept would look like as its own unique character, and drew inspiration from other games, such as Ristar, during his design process for what became Spark. He found that initial reactions to the character's design were poor and attempted to redesign it, but concluded that it just needed to be refined by a different artist. Work on the game had begun by the time of Chrono Adventures development. Daneluz intended for Spark the Electric Jester to be different from Sonic, recounting the gameplay as initially slow, similar to Mega Man, and more mechanically simple than the final release. He found this early iteration to be dull and implemented Sonic elements, such as speed and vertical loops, as a result.

A month-long Kickstarter campaign was launched in late July 2015, accompanied by a demo containing three levels. Daneluz claimed that a "majority of the game's initial development" was complete by the campaign's launch and planned to allocate funds towards the sound design and soundtrack. The music was composed by Andy Tunstall, Falk Au Yeong, Funk Fiction (Pejman Roozbeh), and James Landino, all of whom had previously collaborated on Daneluz's fangames, as well as Michael Staple, a composer for After the Sequel, and Paul Bethers. Alongside music composition, Landino served as the audio lead and helped manage the musicians. Tunstall also served as a sound designer and drew the game's cover art. Otherwise, development was handled primarily by Daneluz while in college, with base programming provided by Héctor Barreiro-Cabrera. The game was built atop the code from Daneluz's Sonic projects initially in Multimedia Fusion 2 before later transitioning to Clickteam Fusion 2.5. Aside from Sonic, the Mega Man X titles and Kirby Super Star were its biggest influences, with Bayonetta and the Super Smash Bros. series also serving as inspiration. The character of Fark was inspired by rival characters from multiple video game series, such as Mega Mans Zero, Kirbys Meta Knight, and Sonic the Hedgehogs Metal Sonic and Shadow, while Freom was based on Dragon Balls Frieza.

Spark the Electric Jester was originally projected for an early 2016 launch on Windows and OS X platforms, but would instead be released on April 10, 2017. It was published under Daneluz's studio name, Feperd Games, for Windows via Steam as his first commercial title. An update was released in June 2018, including various fixes, a rewritten story, and the addition of hard modes.

Reception
Amr Al-Aaser of Rock Paper Shotgun and Jed Whitaker of Destructoid felt that Spark the Electric Jester was successful in incorporating and iterating on its 16-bit-era inspirations. Al-Aaser commended the game for its variety of ideas in both its level gimmicks and power-ups, and opined that it would "remix and refresh old ideas with its own, instead of being content to pay homage". The power-ups were described as more in-depth than those in Sonic 3 & Knuckles by Whitaker, who accredited them towards elevating Spark the Electric Jesters quality to that of the 16-bit Sonic titles. While he characterized the first stage as "ugly" and "disjointed", Whitaker felt the game became better as he progressed, and summarized the level design as "great". Al-Aaser was receptive to Fark's campaign and remarked that the two characters' campaigns "highlight the strengths of the other". Whitaker appreciated the game's amount of unlockable content. He found Fark's campaign to be more difficult than Spark's, which he felt was lacking in challenge. The soundtrack was positively received by both publications. It was described as energetic and powerful by Al-Aaser, and Whitaker believed it was of equal quality to the music found in 16-bit Sonic games.

Sequels
A sequel, Spark the Electric Jester 2, was released through Steam in May 2019 and for the Xbox One in September 2020. Unlike its predecessor, the game features Fark as the protagonist and is a 3D platformer. A third entry, Spark the Electric Jester 3, was released through Steam in August 2022 and is similarly a 3D platformer.

References

2017 video games
Clickteam Fusion games
Crowdfunded video games
Indie video games
Kickstarter-funded video games
Retro-style video games
Side-scrolling platform games
Single-player video games
Video games about robots
Video games developed in Brazil
Windows games
Windows-only games